‌The 2017 West Asian Women's Handball Championship was the second edition of the championship held under the aegis of the Asian Handball Federation. The championship was hosted by the Jordan Handball Federation at Princess Sumaya Hall, Amman (Jordan) from 15 to 21 February 2018.

The championship was previously awarded to Bahrain and scheduled to take place in December 2017 but due to unavoidable circumstances the championship was postponed and then awarded to the Jordan.

Participating teams

1 Bold indicates champion for that year, Italics indicates host.

Referees
The following four referee pairs were selected for the championship.

Round-robin

Final standings

Statistics

Medal summary

Top goalscorers

Top goalkeepers

References

External links
Official Website

2018
West Asian Women's Handball Championship
West Asian Women's Handball Championship
2017 West Asian Women's Handball Championship
West Asian Women's Handball Championship
Sports competitions in Amman